Giovanni da Gaeta (15th-century) was an Italian painter active in the late-Gothic period in Campania and his native Gaeta. Little details are known of his life. An altarpiece of the Assunzione found in San Giovanni a Carbonara in Naples is attributed to him. He may have been influenced by Leonardo da Besozzo or Pisanello, during their stays in Naples.

References

Gothic painters
15th-century Italian painters
Italian male painters
Year of birth unknown
Year of death unknown